The 2016 UCI Para-cycling Track World Championships were the World Championships for track cycling where athletes with a physical disability. The Championships took place at the Montichiari Velodrome in Montichiari, Italy from 17 to 20 March 2016. Great Britain were the most successful team of the competition in total medals (18) and in number of gold medals (8). The Championships saw 11 new world records set.

Classification

Sport class
Cycling
C1 - locomotor disability: Neurological, or amputation
C2 - locomotor disability: Neurological, decrease in muscle strength, or amputation
C3 - locomotor disability: Neurological, or amputation
C4 - locomotor disability: Neurological, or amputation
C5 - locomotor disability: Neurological, or amputation
Tandem
Tandem B - visual impairment

Event winners

 Li Zhangyu set a new world record of 3:51.961 in the men's C1 3km Individual Pursuit during the qualification stages.
 Jozef Metelka set a new world record of 4.26.924 in the men's C4 4km Individual Pursuit during the qualification stages.
 Jessica Gallagher and Madison Janssen set a new world record of 11.045 in the women's Tandem Sprint during the qualifying stages. 
Megan Giglia set a new world record of 4:06.756 in the women's C2 3km Individual Pursuit during the qualification stages.
 Sarah Storey caught Jufang Zhu with five laps to go. Storey's time is that given from her qualification round.

Medal table

Participating nations
32 nations participated.

References

External links
 The Official 2016 UCI Para-cycling Track World Championships results book

UCI Para-cycling Track World Championships
UCI Para-cycling Track World Championships
International cycle races hosted by Italy
UCI Para-cycling Track World Championships